is a Japanese male volleyball player. He was a part of the Japan men's national volleyball team.

References

External links
 profile at FIVB.org

1997 births
Living people
Japanese men's volleyball players
Place of birth missing (living people)